This article is a list of notable unsolved problems in astronomy. Some of these unsolved problems in astronomy are theoretical, meaning that existing theories seem incapable of explaining a certain observed phenomenon or experimental result. The others are experimental, meaning that there is a difficulty in creating an experiment to test a proposed theory or investigate a phenomenon in greater detail. Some pertain to one-off events, unusual occurrences that have not repeated and whose causes therefore remain unclear.

Planetary astronomy

Exoplanetary
 How unusual is our Solar System? Some observed planetary systems contain Super-Earths and Hot Jupiters that orbit very close to their stars (even closer than Mercury). Systems with Jupiter-like planets in Jupiter-like orbits appear to be rare. Is it because of our lack of data, given the difficulty of observing exoplanets? Or can it be explained by the grand tack hypothesis?

Solar system
 Orbiting bodies and rotation:
 Are there any non-dwarf planets beyond Neptune?
 What is the explanation for the elongated orbits of the extreme trans-Neptunian objects?
 Rotation rate of Saturn:
 Why does the magnetosphere of Saturn rotate at a rate close to that at which the planet's clouds rotate?
 What is the true rotation rate of Saturn's deep interior?
 Satellite geomorphology:
 What is the origin of the chain of high mountains that closely follows the equator of Saturn's moon Iapetus?
 Is it the remnant of hot and fast-rotating young Iapetus?
 Is it the result of material (either from the rings of Saturn or its own ring) that over time collected upon the surface?

Stellar astronomy and astrophysics
 Solar cycle:
 How does the Sun generate its periodically reversing large-scale magnetic field?
 How do other solar-like stars generate their magnetic fields, and what are the similarities and differences between stellar activity cycles and that of the Sun?
 What caused the Maunder Minimum and other grand minima, and how does the solar cycle recover from a minimum state?
 Coronal heating problem:
 Why is the Sun's corona (atmosphere layer) so much hotter than the Sun's surface?
 Why is the magnetic reconnection effect many orders of magnitude faster than predicted by standard models?
 Space weather prediction:
 How does the Sun produce strong southward pointing magnetic fields in solar coronal mass ejections that lead to geomagnetic storms? How can we predict solar and geomagnetic superstorms?
 What is the origin of the stellar mass spectrum? That is, why do astronomers observe the same distribution of stellar masses – the initial mass function – apparently regardless of the initial conditions?
 Supernova: What is the exact mechanism by which an implosion of a dying star becomes an explosion?
 p-nuclei: What astrophysical process is responsible for the nucleogenesis of these rare isotopes?
 Fast radio bursts (FRBs): What causes these transient radio pulses from distant galaxies, lasting only a few milliseconds each? Why do some FRBs repeat at unpredictable intervals, but most do not? Dozens of models have been proposed, but none has been widely accepted.
 The Oh-My-God particle and other ultra-high-energy cosmic rays: What physical processes create cosmic rays whose energy exceeds the GZK cuttoff?
 Nature of KIC 8462852, commonly known as Tabby's Star: What is the origin of unusual luminosity changes of this star?

Galactic astronomy and astrophysics

 Galaxy rotation problem: Is dark matter responsible for differences in observed and theoretical speed of stars revolving around the centre of galaxies, or is it something else?
 Age–metallicity relation in the Galactic disk: Is there a universal age–metallicity relation (AMR) in the Galactic disk (both "thin" and "thick" parts of the disk)? Although in the local (primarily thin) disk of the Milky Way there is no evidence of a strong AMR, a sample of 229 nearby "thick" disk stars has been used to investigate the existence of an age–metallicity relation in the Galactic thick disk, and indicate that there is an age–metallicity relation present in the thick disk. Stellar ages from asteroseismology confirm the lack of any strong age-metallicity relation in the Galactic disc.
 Ultraluminous X-ray sources (ULXs): What powers X-ray sources that are not associated with active galactic nuclei but exceed the Eddington limit of a neutron star or stellar black hole? Are they due to intermediate mass black holes? Some ULXs are periodic, suggesting non-isotropic emission from a neutron star. Does this apply to all ULXs? How could such a system form and remain stable?
 What is the origin of the Galactic Center GeV excess? Is it due to the annihilation of dark matter particles or a new population of millisecond pulsars?
 The infrared/TeV crisis: Lack of attenuation of very energetic gamma-rays from extragalactic sources.

Black holes
 Gravitational singularities: Does general relativity break down in the interior of a black hole due to quantum effects, torsion, or other phenomena?
 No-hair theorem:
 Do black holes have an internal structure?
 If so, how might the internal structure be probed?
 Supermassive black holes:
 What is the origin of the M–sigma relation between supermassive black hole mass and galaxy velocity dispersion?
 The formation of high-redshift quasars:
 How do the most distant quasars grow their supermassive black holes up to 1010 solar masses so early in the history of the universe (with redshift > 6-7)?
 Black hole information paradox and black hole radiation:
 Do black holes produce thermal radiation, as expected on theoretical grounds?
 If so, and black holes can evaporate away, what happens to the information stored in them (since quantum mechanics does not provide for the destruction of information)? Or does the radiation stop at some point leaving black hole remnants?
 Firewalls: Does a firewall exist around a black hole?
 Final parsec problem: Supermassive black holes appear to have merged, and what appears to be a pair in this intermediate range has been observed, in PKS 1302-102.  However, theory predicts that when supermassive black holes reach a separation of about one parsec, it would take billions of years to orbit closely enough to merge – more than the age of the universe.
 Naked singularity: Is cosmic censorship hypothesis correct? Does a naked singularity exist?

Cosmology

 Cosmological principle:
 Is the universe homogeneous and isotropic at large enough scales, as claimed by the cosmological principle and assumed by all models that use the Friedmann–Lemaître–Robertson–Walker metric, including the current version of the ΛCDM model, or is the universe inhomogeneous or anisotropic?
 Is the CMB dipole purely kinematic, or does it signal anisotropy of the universe, resulting in the breakdown of the FLRW metric and the cosmological principle?
 Is the Hubble tension evidence that the cosmological principle is false?
 Even if the cosmological principle is correct, is the Friedmann–Lemaître–Robertson–Walker metric the right metric to use for our universe?
 Are the observations usually interpreted as the accelerating expansion of the universe rightly interpreted, or are they instead evidence that the cosmological principle is false?
 Copernican principle: Are cosmological observations made from Earth representative of observations from the average position in the universe?
 Dark matter:
 What is the identity of dark matter?
 Is dark matter a particle? If so, is it a WIMP, an axion, the lightest superpartner (LSP), or some other particle?
 Do the phenomena attributed to dark matter point not to some form of matter but actually to an extension of gravity?
 Dark energy:
 What is the cause of the observed accelerating expansion of the universe (the de Sitter phase)?
 Are the observations rightly interpreted as the accelerating expansion of the universe, or are they evidence that the cosmological principle is false?
 Why is the energy density of the dark energy component of the same magnitude as the density of matter at present when the two evolve quite differently over time?
 Could it be simply that we are observing at exactly the right time?
 Is dark energy a pure cosmological constant or are models of quintessence such as phantom energy applicable?
 Do early dark energy models resolve the Hubble tension?
 Baryon asymmetry: Why is there far more matter than antimatter in the observable universe?
 Cosmological constant problem:
 Why does the zero-point energy of the vacuum not cause a large cosmological constant?
 What cancels it out?
 Size and shape of the universe:
 The diameter of the observable universe is about 93 billion light-years, but what is the size of the whole universe? Is it infinite?
 What is the 3-manifold of comoving space, i.e. of a comoving spatial section of the universe, informally called the "shape" of the universe?
 Neither the curvature nor the topology is presently known, though the curvature is known to be "close" to zero on observable scales. The cosmic inflation hypothesis suggests that the shape of the universe may be unmeasurable, but, since 2003, Jean-Pierre Luminet, et al., and other groups have suggested that the shape of the universe may be the Poincaré dodecahedral space. Is the shape unmeasurable; the Poincaré space; or another 3-manifold?
 Cosmic inflation:
 Is the theory of cosmic inflation in the very early universe correct?
 And, if so, what are the details of this epoch?
 What is the hypothetical  scalar field that gave rise to this cosmic inflation?
 If inflation happened at one point, is it self-sustaining through inflation of quantum-mechanical fluctuations, and thus ongoing in some extremely distant place?
 Horizon problem:
 Why is the distant universe so homogeneous when the Big Bang theory seems to predict larger measurable anisotropies of the night sky than those observed?
 Cosmological inflation is generally accepted as the solution, but are other possible explanations such as a variable speed of light more appropriate?
 Hubble tension: If ΛCDM is correct, why are measurements of the Hubble constant failing to converge?
 Axis of evil: Some large features of the microwave sky at distances of over 13 billion light years appear to be aligned with both the motion and orientation of the solar system. Is this due to systematic errors in processing, contamination of results by local effects, or an unexplained violation of the Copernican principle?
 Why is there something rather than nothing?, origin and future of the universe:
 How did the conditions for anything to exist arise?
 Is there potentially an infinite amount of unknown astronomical phenomena throughout our entire universe?
 Is the universe heading towards a Big Freeze, a Big Rip, a Big Crunch, or a Big Bounce, or is it part of an infinitely recurring cyclic model?
 Multiverse:
 Is there a multiverse? Are there an infinite amount of universes, each infinitely branching into infinite universes within the multiverse? How to test the hypothesis? Is the multiverse one of an infinite amount of infinitely branching multiverses? Are there an infinite amount of higher order verses all infinitely branching?
 Should we embrace the anthropic principle to explain unsolved scientific puzzles such as the cosmological constant problem?

Extraterrestrial life
 Is there other life in the Universe? Especially:
 Is there other intelligent life?
 Is there potentially an infinite amount of extraterrestrial genera throughout our universe?
 If so, what is the explanation for the Fermi paradox?
 Nature of Wow! signal:
 Was this singular event a real signal?
 If so, what was its origin?

See also 
 Lists of unsolved problems
 List of unsolved problems in physics

References 

Astronomy-related lists
Astronomy